Dinajpur is a city and the District headquarters of Dinajpur district situated in Rangpur Division, Bangladesh. It was founded in 1786. It is located 413 km north-west of Dhaka in Bangladesh. It is bounded on the north by Suihari, Katapara, Bangi Bechapara, Pulhat, Koshba on the south, on the east of Sheikhupura and by the river Punarbhaba on the west. Dinajpur is Historically and culturally a very Important city in North Bengal.

Geography and Climate 

Dinajpur is located on the north-western part of the country. It covers an area of 20.7 square kilometers (8.0 sq mi)

It is situated in 25°37′ N. latitude and  88°39′ E longitude on the eastern bank of the river Punarbhaba. Dinajpur has a humid subtropical climate (Cwa) that borders a tropical climate and has humid, hot summers, characterized monsoon season and mild, dry winters.

Literacy 
The percentage of literacy in the city is 85.05% which is quite high compared with that of other cities in Bangladesh. The progress of education has been marked by gradual and steady increase in the proportion of literates.

Education 
Over the last 25 years, Dinajpur has attracted some prominent educational institutions, all of which are government financed. They are as follows:

Hajee Mohammad Danesh Science & Technology University is located 13 km north of Dinajpur town and is one of the prominent institutions in North Bengal. It offers various undergraduate programs such as computer science, BBA, agriculture, fisheries, veterinary medicine and postgraduate programs like agronomy, horticulture and soil science.

Established in 1992, M Abdur Rahim Medical College (former Dinajpur Medical College) is one of the 36 government financed medical institutions located at historical Ananda sagar area in Dinajpur City. Currently, it offers a five-year MBBS Program, along with a one-year compulsory post-graduation internship program. In 2009, Dinajpur city began an English version of education. Some notable English Version schools are: Bethel Int'l School, Dinajpur Ridge School, Dinajpur Labrotary School, Dinajpur Public School, South Point School and Green International School. Dinajpur Polytechnic Institute, Textile Institute Dinajpur, Saint Philip's High School & College, Saint Joseph School Dinajpur, Dinajpur Zilla school, Dinajpur Govt.Girls High School, Dinajpur High School, Dinajpur Police Line School, Dinajpur Collectorate School & College,  Dinajpur Govt. College,  is one of the best institutions  in Dinajpur.

Tenth educational board of Bangladesh has been established in Dinajpur in 2007. From 2009 S.S.C. (Secondary School Certificate) and H.S.C. (Higher Secondary School Certificate) exams have been started to be taken. In S.S.C. exam for the first time it stood 2nd in the country in the G.P.A. 5 list.

Municipality 
At first, after its formation in 1856, the Dinajpur Municipality used to be run by a town committee presided over by the Deputy Magistrate. This was among the first 40 municipalities in Bengal at that time. Later in 1868, the 'District Town Act' commissioned a chairman of the municipality who replaced the Deputy Magistrate and given a similar rank as a District Magistrate. Mr. Patterson was appointed the first chairman of Dinajpur Municipality in 1869. Now present chairman is Sued Jahangir Alam.

Agriculture 
Dinajpur is famous for agriculture. Specially Dinajpur is famous for its Litchi and aromatic rice(Katarivog).

Notable people
 Air Vice-Marshal Mumtaz Uddin Ahmed, Seventh Chief of Airstaff, Bangladesh Air Force.
 Narayan Gangopadhyay, a Bengali novelist, poet, essayist, and short-story writer, and one of the leading writers of modern Bengali literature. 
 Haji Mohammad Danesh, a Bangladeshi politician and communist activist.
 Atmasthananda, fifteenth president of the Ramakrishna Math and the Ramakrishna Mission.
 Debojyoti Mishra, an Indian music director and film composer.
 Liton Das, Cricketer Playing in Bangladesh National Team.
Shawkat Ali, Prominent novelist.
Mohammad Farhad, popularly known as "Comrade Farhad", was a guerrilla force commander during the Bangladesh independence war, and the President of Communist Party of Bangladesh and a member of Bangladesh Parliament.

Gallery

References

External links

 
 

Dinajpur District, Bangladesh
Populated places in Rangpur Division
1786 establishments in the British Empire
1786 establishments in India